Chaudhry Muhammad Hussain was a Pakistani industrialist and cricket administrator who served as the Chairman of the Pakistan Cricket Board (PCB) between April 1977 and July 1978. He was the co-founder of Service Industries Limited.

References

Further reading
 Memon, Taher (2018): Another Perspective: History of Pakistan Cricket 1977-98, Troubador Publishing. .

Service Industries Limited
Year of birth missing
Pakistani industrialists
Pakistan Cricket Board Presidents and Chairmen
People from Gujrat District